The women's 1500 metres in speed skating at the 1992 Winter Olympics took place on February 12, at the L'anneau de vitesse.

Records
Prior to this competition, the existing world and Olympic records were as follows:

Results

References

Women's speed skating at the 1992 Winter Olympics
Skat